McMaster may refer to:

 Mount McMaster, in Enderby Land, East Antarctica
 McMaster (surname)
 McMaster School, a building of the University of South Carolina
 McMaster University, a university in Hamilton, Ontario, Canada

See also
 McMaster-Carr, industrial supply company
 MacMaster (surname)
 McMasters (surname)

.